Michael Angelo Bellisario (born April 7, 1980) is an American actor and the son of scriptwriter and producer Donald P. Bellisario.

Bellisario has mostly had parts in series produced by his father. He played Midshipman Michael "Mikey" Roberts in JAG and also appeared during the first part of NCIS season 3 as Charles "Chip" Sterling.  He has also appeared in four episodes of Quantum Leap. In the pilot chapter of JAG, Michael was the boy rowing in the Adriatic in the aperture scene. He was 15 at this time. At the end of S03E01, he makes a pizza delivery to a police station.

Michael has two other siblings who are actors: half-sister Troian Bellisario (Spencer Hastings on Pretty Little Liars) and stepbrother Sean Murray (Timothy McGee on NCIS).

Filmography

Film 
 Bravo (1998) as President's Son-in-law 
 Lords of the Underworld (2006) as James Vane
 Kush (2007) as Doctor Belmont
 Beyond the Trophy (2012) Producer
 Pretty Perfect (2014) as Marc
 211 (2020) as Hyde
 Disturbing the Peace (2020) as Pyro
 Elvis (2020) as Jack

Television 
 Quantum Leap (1989–1993) as Little Boy/Billy/Martin Jr.
 JAG (1995–2005) as Midshipman Mike "Mikey" Roberts
 Good Day L.A. (2002) as himself
 VH1 Big in 04 (2004) as Guest/Sketch
 The Girls Next Door (2005) as himself
 NCIS (2005) as Charles "Chip" Sterling
 Sunset Tan (2007) as himself

External links

American male film actors
American male television actors
1980 births
Living people
American people of Serbian descent
Bellisario family
20th-century American male actors
21st-century American male actors